The China Seas consist of a series of marginal seas in the Western Pacific Ocean, around China. They are the major components signifying the transition from the continent of Asia to the Pacific Ocean. They have been described in terms of their collective vastness and complexity:

Seas included in the China Seas are: 

 The East China Sea
 The South China Sea
 The Yellow Sea (including Bohai Sea and Korea Bay)

See also

 East Sea (Chinese literature) 
 Four Seas

References

 
Marginal seas of the Pacific Ocean